The Aviation Safety Action Program (ASAP) is a US aviation proactive safety program.  ASAP promotes safety by encouraging voluntary self reporting of safety occurrences and situations to the Federal Aviation Administration (FAA) certificate holder.  The reports are analyzed to reduce hazards and focus training.  Reporting is encouraged by providing the volunteer reporter protection from certificate action.  ASAP forms a safety team between the FAA, the certificate holder (airline/operator), employee, and the operator's employee labor organization.  Safety improvement occurs without discipline, encouraging further and continued hazard reporting.

FAA guidance
The US Department of Transportation FAA produces the Advisory Circular 120-66C directing how to implement the ASAP program at the certificate holder's company.  The Aviation Safety Action Program (ASAP) starts with all parties, FAA/Certificate holder/Union, signing a memorandum of understanding (MOU). The time frame for ASAP report submission is limited.  Reports are reviewed by the Event Review Committee (ERC) normally composed of the FAA, operator, and union representative.  The ERC normally decides to accept an ASAP report unless it is ineligible.  Accepted ASAP reports are reviewed for data and possible further action such as employee contact or additional training.

ASAP ineligibility
ASAP reports are ineligible if: there is intentional noncompliance; safety is intentionally disregarded; actions are criminal; substance abuse; or intentional falsification.

Sister programs
Other proactive safety programs include the Flight Operations Quality Assurance and NASA's Aviation Safety Reporting System.

Other safety improvement initiatives 
In addition to ASAP, other major US Aviation safety improvement initiatives include:  the Commercial Aviation Safety Teamt (CAST); the International Helicopter Safety Team; and the European Strategic Safety Initiative (ESSI).
 Africa African Safety Enhancement Team
 COSCAP   Bangul Accord Group
 COSCAP   Communate Economique et Monétaire de l'Afrique Centrale
 COSCAP   Union Economique et Monétaire Ouest Africaine
 Asia/Pacific  Cooperative Development of Operational Safety and Continuing Airworthiness Program (COSCAP).
 Central/South America  Pan American Aviation Safety Team
 Middle East  COSCAP Gulf States Russia COSCAP Commonwealth of Independent States
 The European Commercial Aviation Safety Team (ECAST)
ECAST addresses large aircraft operations. It was launched in October 2006 by the team that created the ESSI. ECAST is in Europe the equivalent of CAST in the US. ECAST aims at further enhancing fixed-wing commercial aviation safety in Europe, and for European citizen worldwide.  Other European efforts include the European Helicopter Safety Team (EHEST) and the European General Aviation Safety Team.
 EASA
 FAA
 ICAO
 Civil Aviation Authority
 Air safety
 Accident

References

External links
 NASA Aviation Safety Reporting System
 CAST website
 EASA website
 FAA Safety Team website

Aviation safety